Lee Sang-ho (born 12 September 1995) is a South Korean snowboarder who competes internationally.

He competed in the 2018 Winter Olympics, where he won a silver medal in parallel giant slalom.

References

External links

Living people
Olympic snowboarders of South Korea
Snowboarders at the 2018 Winter Olympics
Snowboarders at the 2022 Winter Olympics
South Korean male snowboarders
Medalists at the 2018 Winter Olympics
Olympic silver medalists for South Korea
Olympic medalists in snowboarding
Asian Games medalists in snowboarding
Snowboarders at the 2017 Asian Winter Games
Asian Games gold medalists for South Korea
Medalists at the 2017 Asian Winter Games
People from Jeongseon County
1995 births
Universiade bronze medalists for South Korea
Universiade medalists in snowboarding
Competitors at the 2019 Winter Universiade
South Korean Buddhists
Competitors at the 2015 Winter Universiade
Sportspeople from Gangwon Province, South Korea
21st-century South Korean people